The Salsoloideae are a subfamily of the Amaranthaceae, formerly in family Chenopodiaceae.

Description 
These are herbs, subshrubs, shrubs and some trees. Stems and leaves are often succulent. The ovary contains a spiral embryo. In most genera, scarious wings develop at the outside of the fruiting perianth, allowing for dispersal by the wind (anemochory). 
In tribe Caroxyleae, the stamens have vesiculose anther appendages, discolor with anthers, that probably play a role for insect pollination. In tribe Salsoleae the anther appendages are absent or small and inconspicuous.

Distribution 
The area with most species (center of diversity) are the deserts and semideserts of Central-Asia and the Middle East. Distribution of the subfamily extends to the Mediterranean, to Middle-Europe, north and south Africa, and Australia, some species have also been introduced to America. Many species grow in dry habitats (xerophytes) or tolerate salty soils (halophytes), some are ruderals.

Photosynthesis pathway 
Salsoloideae are  plants (with a few exceptions in tribe Salsoleae). Tribe Caroxyleae is exclusively of the NAD-malic enzyme  subtype. Most Salsoleae also use the NADP-malic enzyme.

Taxonomy 

The type genus of subfamily Salsoloideae is Salsola L. According to recent research, the former classification did not reflect the phylogenetic relationship, so that the subfamily had to be reclassified; it is now split in two tribes, Caroxyleae and Salsoleae (in the strict sense). The tribe Camphorosmeae is now treated in its own subfamily, Camphorosmoideae.

Caroxyleae
Caroxyleae Akhani & E. H. Roalson (as "Caroxyloneae")
 Caroxylon Thunb., with 43 species
 Climacoptera Botsch., with 41 species
 Halarchon Bunge, with one species
 Halarchon vesiculosum (Moq.) Bunge
 Halimocnemis C. A. Mey., with 27 species (Syn. Gamanthus Bunge, Halanthium C. Koch, Halotis Bunge)
 Halocharis Moq., with 7 species
 Kaviria Akhani & E. H. Roalson, with 10 species
 Nanophyton Less., with ca. 10 species
 Ofaiston Raf., with one species
 Ofaiston monandrum (Pall.) Moq.
 Petrosimonia Bunge, with 12 species
 Piptoptera Bunge, with one species
 Piptoptera turkestana Bunge
 Physandra Botsch., with one species
 Physandra halimocnemis (Botsch.) Botsch.
 Pyankovia Akhani & E. H. Roalson, with one species
 Pyankovia brachiata (Pall.) Akhani & E. H. Roalson

Salsoleae
 Anabasis L. ( incl. Fredolia (Coss. & Durieu ex Bunge) Ulbr.), with 29 species
 Arthrophytum Schrenk, with 9 species
 Cornulaca Delile, with 5 species
 Cyathobasis Aellen, with one species:
 Cyathobasis fruticulosa (Bunge) Aellen
 Girgensohnia Bunge ex Fenzl, with 4 species
 Halogeton C. A. Mey, with 5 species. (Syn. Agathophora (Fenzl) Bunge, Micropeplis Bunge)
 Halothamnus Jaub. & Spach, with 21 species
 Haloxylon Bunge, with 2 species
 Haloxylon ammodendron
 Haloxylon persicum
 Hammada Iljin, with 12 species
 Horaninowia Fisch. & C. A. Mey, with 6 species
 Kali Mill., with 13 species:
 Kali turgidum Moench (Syn. Salsola kali subsp. kali)
 Kali tragus (L.) Scop. (Syn. Salsola kali subsp. tragus)
 Lagenantha Chiov. (Syn.: Gyroptera Botsch.) Classification not sure. With 1-3 species.
 Noaea Moq., with 3 species
 Nucularia Batt., Classification not sure. With one species:
 Nucularia perrini Batt.
 Rhaphidophyton Iljin, with one species
 Rhaphidophyton regelii (Bunge) Iljin
 Salsola L., with 25 species. (Syn. Darneilla Maire & Weiller, Fadenia Aellen & Townsend, Neocaspia Tzvelev, Hypocylix Wol.)
 Seidlitzia Bunge ex Boiss.
 Sympegma Bunge
 Traganum Del., with 2 species
 Traganopsis Maire et Wilczek, with one species
 Traganopsis glomerata Maire & Wilczek
 Turania Akhani & E. H. Roalson, with 4 species
 Xylosalsola Tzvelev, with 4 species
 Classification within Salsoleae unclear:
 "Canarosalsola"-Clade: 
 Salsola divaricata Masson ex Link.
 "Collinosalsola"-Clade:
 Salsola arbusculiformis Drob.
 Salsola laricifolia Turcz. ex Litw.
 "Oreosalsola"-Clade:
 Salsola abrotanoides Bunge
 Salsola botschantzevii Kurbanov
 Salsola flexuosa Botsch.
 Salsola junatovii Botsch.
 Salsola lipschitzii Botsch.
 Salsola maracandica Iljin
 Salsola masenderanica Botsch.
 Salsola montana Litw.
 Salsola oreophila Botsch.
 Salsola tianschanica Botsch.
 Others:
 Salsola genistoides Juss. ex Poir.
 Salsola pachyphylla Botsch.
 Salsola webbii Moq.

Classification in subfamily not sure
 Iljinia Korovin, with one species: 
 Iljinia regelii (Bunge) Korovin

References

External links 

Amaranthaceae
Caryophyllales subfamilies